"I Knew the Bride (When She Used to Rock 'n' Roll)" is a song written by Nick Lowe and first popularized by Dave Edmunds.  It was released on Edmunds's 1977 album Get It and a year later in a live version by Nick Lowe's Last Chicken in the Shop on Live Stiffs Live.

Lowe performed the song during a Stiff Records European tour with Elvis Costello, Ian Dury, Wreckless Eric, and Larry Wallis; the tour was filmed for the 1981 documentary If It Ain't Stiff, It Ain't Worth a Fuck. In 1985, Nick Lowe recorded a slower studio version for the album The Rose of England, produced by Huey Lewis (on harmonica) and featuring Lewis' band "The News".  It reached #27 on the US rock chart and #77 on the US pop chart.

Edmunds released several live versions over the years, from 1987's I Hear You Rockin’, to 1999's KIng Biscuit Flour Hour Presents, to 2005's Live and Pickin’, and 2011's A Pile of Rock Live.  He also released a remixed studio version on 1999's Hand Picked Musical Fantasies, which also appeared on the 2004 release From Small Things: The Best of Dave Edmunds. The original recording appeared on many of his compilation releases, including 1981's The Best of Dave Edmunds, 1994's Chronicles, and 2008's The Many Sides of Dave Edmunds: The Greatest Hits and More.

Live versions featuring Edmunds and Lowe harmonizing appeared on two albums from Rockpile, the group featuring both singers, as well as Billy Bremner and Terry Williams.  The official release was on the Live at Montreux 1980 album in 2011, but the song was also on the much earlier bootleg album They Call It Rock from the late 1970s.

Other appearances
Hunter S. Thompson's Songs of the Doomed: More Notes on the Death of the American Dream, a 1990 anthology of essays and works of new journalism, has a chapter named after the song.

The song is part of the Sounds of the Seventies: Punk and New Wave from Time-Life Records.

British poet Hugo Williams titled his 11th book after the song; an earlier collection had similarly been named after an Everly Brothers song.

Critical reception
Robert Christgau, upon the release of Live Stiffs Live, characterized the song as "Lowe's answer to "You Never Can Tell", a 1964 song by Chuck Berry.  Decades later, Austin City Limits called it a "cheeky roots/pop tune."

Notable cover versions 
Cover versions of the song have been released on various albums, including:
 1983: Promised Land by Johnnie Allan
 1987: as "I Knew the Bride (When She Used to be a Moll)" on Born Again Piss Tank by novelty singer Kevin Bloody Wilson
 1992: Dream on Fire by Dion
 1998: Very Best of the Knack, recorded for a greatest hits compilation album by The Knack, released by Rhino Records
 2003: Live at 12th and Porter by Trent Summar & the New Row Mob
 2006: Under the Influence by Status Quo (bonus track on the re-release of the 1999 album)
 2008: Love Must Be Tough by Eleanor McEvoy

References

1977 songs
1985 singles
Songs written by Nick Lowe
Nick Lowe songs
Dave Edmunds songs
Dion DiMucci songs
The Knack songs
Trent Summar & the New Row Mob songs
Rockabilly songs
Status Quo (band) songs
Stiff Records singles
Swan Song Records singles
Songs about marriage